Garmisch-Partenkirchen Hausberg station is a railway station in the municipality of Garmisch-Partenkirchen, located in the Garmisch-Partenkirchen district in Bavaria, Germany.

Notable places nearby
Hausberg

References

Railway stations in Garmisch-Partenkirchen
Buildings and structures in Garmisch-Partenkirchen (district)